Gorakh Prasad Jaiswal  (born 25 September 1938) is an Indian Politician and was a Member of Parliament of the 15th Lok Sabha of India. He represented the Deoria constituency of Uttar Pradesh as a member of the Bahujan Samaj Party political party.

Early life and education
Gorakh Prasad Jaiswal was born in Deoria in the state of Uttar Pradesh. His highest attained education is matriculation. By profession, he is an Agriculturist and a Businessperson.

Political career
Gorakh Prasad Jaiswal is a first time M.P. He succeeded Mohan Singh who was a M.P in the 14th Lok Sabha and belonged to Samajwadi Party.

Posts held

See also

15th Lok Sabha
Politics of India
Parliament of India
Government of India
Bahujan Samaj Party
Deoria (Lok Sabha constituency)

References 

India MPs 2009–2014
1938 births
Bahujan Samaj Party politicians from Uttar Pradesh
Lok Sabha members from Uttar Pradesh
People from Deoria, Uttar Pradesh
People from Deoria district
Living people